Louis Delaunay-Belleville (20 November 1843, Corbeil – 10 February 1912, Cannes) was a French engineer.

Personal life
Educated at St. Barbe and the École Polytechnique, he entered the Naval Engineering School in 1864 and in 1867 left to join the Belleville works at St. Denis, near Paris.

He married Marie Anne Elisabeth Belleville daughter of Julien Belleville (1823–1896) and he became a partner and finally head of the firm which produced the well-known Belleville boilers, and later the Delaunay-Belleville automobile. In 1884 he changed his surname to Delaunay-Belleville.

Encharges
 President of the Paris Chamber of Commerce from 1890 to 1909
 Régent of Banque of France
 Directeur Général Exposition Universelle de Paris (1900).

Books
 Du régime commercial des ports de navigation intérieure en France
 Lois et règlements concernant les appareils à vapeur, en Europe et aux États-Unis d'Amérique

Honours
 He was conferred in Spain Cross of Naval Merit in 11 April 1899
 He was conferred the Grand Officier de la Légion d'honneur in 12 April 1900.
 He was conferred in Spain Cross of Order of Charles III in 25 October 1900

References

Sources

External links

1843 births
1912 deaths
Engineers from Paris
Businesspeople from Paris